Mastixia pentandra subsp. scortechinii is a subspecies of Mastixia pentandra. It is a tree in the family Nyssaceae. It is named for the botanist Benedetto Scortechini.

Description
The fissured bark is grey-brown. The flowers are greenish or yellowish white.

Distribution and habitat
Mastixia pentandra subsp. scortechinii grows naturally in Thailand, Sumatra, Peninsular Malaysia, Borneo and Sulawesi. Its habitat is lowland to submontane forests from sea-level to  altitude.

References

pentandra subsp. scortechinii
Trees of Thailand
Trees of Malesia
Plant subspecies
Plants described in 1976